was a Japanese Maritime Self-Defense Force officer, a former Ministry of Communications and a bureaucrat of the Ministry of Transport.

As a member of the Y Committee, he contributed to the establishment of the Maritime Self-Defense Force, concluded a Japan-US ship loan agreement based on the MSA agreement, and started domestic production of escort vessels. After completing the bridge from the Coast Guard to Navy, he returned to the Ministry of Transport and became the top office worker.

Career
Born in Fukuoka prefecture. Born as the fifth son of Ryotaro Yamazaki. After finishing Fukuoka Prefectural Tochiku Middle School (now ) and Seventh Higher School Zoshikan (now Kagoshima University), he graduated from the Department of Law, Faculty of Law, Tokyo Imperial University in March 1931. Passed the Higher Examination Judicial Examination in December 1929 and the Higher Examination Administrative Examination in October 1930. 

In March 1931, he graduated from Tokyo Imperial University and April of the same year, he joined the Ministry of Communications. 

On 25 June 1947, Deputy General Manager of Illegal Immigration Ship Monitoring Headquarters. 

On 25 May 1949, he was appointed as Prime Minister's Secretary. A member of the Headquarters for Economic Stability, working at the Wheeling Bureau of the Headquarters for Economic Stability. On June 1st, he worked at the Construction and Transportation Bureau. On July 1st, Deputy Director of Construction and Transportation Bureau. 

On 18 May 1951, he was appointed Deputy Director of the Japan Coast Guard. 

On 26 April 1952, the Maritime Guard was established, appointed as a Maritime Guard, and was appointed as the Chief of the Maritime Guard after being deceived by the Maritime Guard. On August 1st, the National Safety Agency Coastal Security Force was established and became the 2nd Chief of Staff.  

On 1 July 1954, he became the first Chief of Staff, Maritime Self-Defense Force. On August 3rd, he retired from the Chief of Staff, Maritime Staff, seconded from the Defense Agency to the Ministry of Transport. Inaugurated as the 24th Vice-Minister of Transport.

On 14 February 1956, he resigned as Vice-Minister of Transport and in July, he became a candidate for the House of Councilors election officially recognized by the Liberal Democratic Party from Fukuoka Prefecture, but failed.

On 2 August 1976, he passed away at a hospital in Tokyo due to heart failure at the age of 70 years old. The fourth rank and the Order of the Sacred Treasure, Second Prize, were awarded.

Awards
 
 Order of the Sacred Treasure

See also
Japanese military ranks

References

1905 births
1976 deaths
People from Fukuoka Prefecture
Military personnel from Fukuoka Prefecture
University of Tokyo alumni
Kagoshima University alumni